The 1958 Lituya Bay earthquake occurred on PST with a moment magnitude of 7.8 to 8.3 and a maximum Mercalli intensity of XI (Extreme). The strike-slip earthquake took place on the Fairweather Fault and triggered a rockslide of 30 million cubic meters (40 million cubic yards) and about 90 million tons into the narrow inlet of Lituya Bay, Alaska. This is the largest and most significant megatsunami in modern times; it forced a re-evaluation of large-wave events and the recognition of impact events, rockfalls, and landslides as causes of very large waves.

Event outline
 

Lituya Bay is a fjord located on the Fairweather Fault in the northeastern part of the Gulf of Alaska. The narrow entrance of the bay has a depth of only . The two arms that create the top of the T-shape of the bay are the Gilbert and Crillon inlets and are a part of a trench on the Fairweather Fault. In the past 170 years Lituya Bay has had four other tsunamis over 100 ft: 1854, 1899, 1936, and 1958.

Near the crest of the Fairweather Mountains sit the Lituya and the North Crillon glaciers. The retreats of these glaciers form the present "T" shape of the bay, the Gilbert and Crillon inlets.

Earthquake

The major earthquake that struck on the Fairweather Fault had a moment magnitude of 7.8 and a maximum perceived intensity of XI (Extreme) on the Mercalli intensity scale. This earthquake had been the strongest in over 50 years for this region: the Cape Yakataga earthquake, with an estimated magnitude of 8.2 on the Richter scale, occurred on September 4, 1899.

Rockfall

The earthquake caused a subaerial rockfall in the Gilbert Inlet. Over 30 million cubic meters of rock fell from a height of several hundred meters into the bay, creating the megatsunami. The impact of the rockslide included the creation of wave run up that shaved up to 400m of ice off the front of the Lituya Glacier and eroded or completely eradicated its rocky deltas. After the earthquake it was observed that a subglacial lake, located northwest of the bend in the Lituya Glacier at the head of Lituya Bay, had dropped . The wave caused damage to the vegetation up the headlands around the area where the rockfall occurred, up to a height of 524 meters, as well as along the shoreline of the bay. It is possible that a good amount of water drained from the glacial lake through a glacial tunnel flowing directly in front of the glacier, though neither the rate of drainage nor the volume of water drained could produce a wave of such magnitude. Even if a large enough drainage were to take place in front of the Gilbert Glacier, the run-off would have been projected to be on the opposite side in Crillon Inlet. After these considerations it was determined that glacial drainage was not the mechanism that caused the giant wave.

Megatsunami 
A total of 5 people were killed during the tsunami, which left many people injured and many homes destroyed. Two people from a fishing boat died as a result of being caught by a wave in the bay. Two more individuals, a fishing boat captain and his seven-year-old son, were struck by the wave and lifted hundreds of feet into the air by the swell. Remarkably, both survived with minimal injuries. In Yakutat, the only permanent outpost close to the epicenter at the time, infrastructure such as bridges, docks, and oil lines all sustained damage. A wave tower collapsed and a cabin was damaged beyond repair. Sand boils and fissures occurred near the coast southeast of there, and underwater cables that supported the Alaska Communication System were cut. Lighter damage was also reported in Pelican and Sitka. It ripped limbs off trees and swept many away, decimating the shoreline's surrounding forest and leaving the high tide line barren and with few upright surviving trees except on the northern and southern edges. The megatsunami flooded the entire bay and created a damage line up to  around the outline of the bay, with evidence of this damage line still visible from space to this day.

Eyewitness accounts

Swanson account 
At 22:15 hours PST on July 9, 1958, which was still daylight at that time of year, an earthquake with a magnitude of 7.8 struck the Lituya Bay area. The tide was ebbing at about plus 1.5 m and the weather was clear. Anchored in a cove near the west side of the entrance of the bay, Bill and Vivian Swanson were on their boat fishing when the earthquake hit:

Ulrich account 
When the earthquake struck, Howard G. Ulrich and his 7-year-old son were in Lituya Bay aboard their boat, the Edrie. They were anchored in a small inlet on the southern side of the bay. The two had gone out on the water at 20:00 hours PST and when the earthquake hit, the resulting rocking of his boat woke Ulrich up. He observed the wave's formation from the deck, hearing a very loud smash at the base of Lituya Bay. In his record of the wave he notes the appearance of it and how it formed:

The wave made its way to his boat 2–3 minutes after he saw it and carried the Edrie down to the southern shore and then back near the center of the bay. Ulrich was able to control the boat once the main wave passed, maneuvering through subsequent waves up to 20 ft high until he could finally exit the bay.

Evidence of past events
Four or five megatsunamis are believed to have occurred at Lituya Bay during a 150-year period:
 Reports by early explorers of the loss of all trees and vegetation along the shore, and cut tree-lines. One example is the log of Jean Francois de Galaup who was the first European person to discover the bay in 1786.
 "At least one and possibly two waves" between 1854 and 1916, based on photographic evidence.
 A further event that erased the above evidence and uprooted trees over  up the sides of the bay, in 1936. 
 The 1958 event.

Ongoing debate 
There is an ongoing debate in scholarly circles regarding whether the megatsunami was a result of the rockfall generated by the earthquake, or a result of the earthquake itself. Various analyses to determine the true cause have been conducted.

1999 analysis 
The mechanism giving rise to megatsunamis was analyzed for the Lituya Bay event in a study presented at the Tsunami Society in 1999.

Although the earthquake which caused the megatsunami was very energetic and involved strong ground movements, several possible mechanisms were not likely or able to have caused the resulting megatsunami. Neither water drainage from a lake, nor landslide, nor the force of the earthquake itself led to the megatsunami, although all of these may have contributed.

Instead, the megatsunami was caused by a massive and sudden impulsive impact when about 40 million cubic yards of rock several hundred meters above the bay was fractured from the side of the bay, by the earthquake, and fell "practically as a monolithic unit" down the almost vertical slope and into the bay. The rockfall also caused air to be dragged along due to viscosity effects, which added to the volume of displacement, and further impacted the sediment on the floor of the bay, creating a large crater. The study concluded that:

 The large mass of rock, acting as a monolith (thus resembling high-angle asteroid impact), struck with great force the sediments at bottom of Gilbert Inlet at the head of the bay. The impact created a large crater and displaced and folded recent and Tertiary deposits and sedimentary layers to an unknown depth. The displaced water and the displacement and folding of the sediments broke and uplifted  of ice along the entire front of the Lituya Glacier at the north end of Gilbert Inlet. Also, the impact and the sediment displacement by the rockfall resulted in an air bubble and in water splashing action that reached the  elevation on the other side of the head of Gilbert Inlet.

 This was the most likely scenario of the event – the "PC model" that was adopted for subsequent mathematical modeling studies with source dimensions and parameters provided as input.

Subsequent mathematical modeling at the Los Alamos National Laboratory (Mader, 1999, Mader & Gittings, 2002) supported the proposed mechanism – as there was indeed sufficient volume of water and an adequately deep layer of sediments in the Lituya Bay inlet to account for the giant wave runup and the subsequent inundation. The modeling reproduced the documented physical observations of runup.

2010 analysis
A 2010 model examined the amount of infill on the floor of the bay, which was many times larger than that of the rockfall alone, as well as the energy and height of the waves. Scientists concluded that there had been a "dual slide" involving a rockfall which also triggered a release of 5 to 10 times its volume of sediment trapped by the adjacent Lituya Glacier, a ratio comparable with other events where this "dual slide" effect is known to have happened. Lituya Bay has a history of megatsunami events, but the 1958 event was the first for which sufficient data was captured and was responsible for the deaths of 5 people.

A subsequent analysis to the 1999 one that examined the wider impact of the event found that the rockfall itself was inadequate to explain the resulting accounts and evidence. In particular, the amount of sediment apparently added to the bay, judging by the sea-floor shape, was much greater than could be explained by the rockfall alone, or even the rockfall and sediment disturbed by it, and the energy of the resulting waves from the rockfall and stirred-up sediment would not have been sufficient. The glacier, lightened, rose before stabilizing in the water, and a large amount of trapped infill (subglacial and proglacial sediment) that was trapped under the glacier and had already been loosened by the earthquake was released as an almost immediate and many times larger second slide. The debris released was estimated by the study as being between 5 and 10 times the volume of the initial rockfall, a bulking ratio comparable with that of other events such as the September 2002 Kolka-Karmadon rock ice slide (estimated ratio between 5 and 10), the November 1987 Parraguirre landslide (est. ratio 2.5) and the May 1970 Huascarán landslide (est. ratio 4). This additional volume would explain the large changes in the underwater shape of the sea floor in the bay, and the additional energy of waves, especially at the western end of the bay.

See also
Icy Bay (Alaska) for a very similar event in 2015
List of earthquakes in 1958
List of earthquakes in Alaska
List of earthquakes in the United States
List of tsunamis
Lituya Mountain

References

Notes

Further reading

External links 

 Gary Griggs, "Our Ocean Backyard: Tsunami rocked Alaska's Lituya Bay in 1958", Santa Cruz Sentinel, April 9, 2011
 Dave Kiffer, "Surviving the Biggest Wave Ever 50 Years Ago, 1,700 Foot Wave Devastated Lituya Bay", SitNews, July 8, 2008.
 Sonny and Howard Ulrich, Video retelling of their surviving the event & simulated megatsunami
 Horizon, BBC, first broadcast October 12, 2000. (Mega-tsunami: Wave of Destruction)
 

Lituya Bay earthquake and megatsunami
Lituya Bay earthquake and megatsunami
Lituya
Floods in the United States
Tsunamis in the United States
Lituya Bay megatsunami
Lituya Bay earthquake and megatsunami
Lituya Bay earthquake and megatsunami
Lituya Bay earthquake and megatsunami
Lituya Bay earthquake and megatsunami
Megatsunamis

pl:Megatsunami w Zatoce Lituya